The Vuelta Ciclista a Costa Rica (English: Tour of Costa Rica) is a bicycle racing stage race held annually since 1965 in Costa Rica. The men's Vuelta carries a UCI rating of 2.2 and is part of the UCI America Tour, which is one of six UCI Continental Circuits sponsored by the Union Cycliste Internationale, the sport's international governing body. For the women's race see; Vuelta Internacional Femenina a Costa Rica.

Doping
On 31 January 2018 the UCI announced that they had suspended a number of riders who competed in the 2017 edition of the race, after they tested positive for the third generation blood booster – EPO-CERA. Overall winner Juan Carlos Rojas (Frijoles Los Tierniticos), third place César Rojas Villegas,
Leandro Varela, Vladimir Fernandez who won stage 4 of the race, Jose Villalobos, Jason Huertas, Jose Irias, Gabriel Marin, Melvin Mora, Kevin Murillo Solano and Jordy Sandoval.

Past winners

References

Cycle races in Costa Rica
UCI America Tour races
Recurring sporting events established in 1965
1965 establishments in Costa Rica